Dohwa-cha or peach flower tea is a traditional Korean tea made from the dried peach flowers. It is believed that dohwa-cha helps treating constipation and calculus.

Preparation 
The flowers are harvested during the springtime, dried in shade, and kept in a paper bag. Stamens are removed before being dried. Dohwa-cha usually comes pre-made. It is recommended to steep the buds for 5 to 10 min after adding to water. Times may vary depending on preference of strength.

References 

Korean tea
Flower tea